The Cà Lồ River is a river of Vietnam. It flows through Vĩnh Phúc Province, Hanoi and Bắc Ninh Province for 89 kilometres and has a basin area of 880 km².

References

Rivers of Vĩnh Phúc province
Rivers of Hanoi
Rivers of Bắc Ninh province
Rivers of Vietnam